Anthene katera is a butterfly in the family Lycaenidae. It is found in the north-eastern part of the Democratic Republic of the Congo, Uganda and north-western Tanzania. The habitat consists of forests.

References

Butterflies described in 1937
Anthene